Lennox was an electoral riding in Ontario, Canada. It was created in 1867 at the time of confederation and was abolished in 1933 before the 1934 election.

Members of Provincial Parliament

References

Former provincial electoral districts of Ontario